NGC 1055 is an edge-on spiral galaxy located in the constellation Cetus. The galaxy has a prominent nuclear bulge crossed by a wide, knotty, dark lane of dust and gas.  The spiral arm structure appears to be elevated above the galaxy's plane and obscures the upper half of the bulge. Discovered on December 19, 1783 by William Herschel from his home in Slough England.

It is a binary system together with the bright spiral galaxy M77 (NGC 1068). These two are the largest galaxies of a small galaxy group that also includes NGC 1073, and five other small irregular galaxies.

NGC 1087, NGC 1090, and NGC 1094 appear close, but they simply appear in the field of view and are background galaxies.

Based on the published red shift, (Hubble Constant of 62 km/s per Mpc) a rough distance estimate for NGC 1055 is 52 million light-years, with a diameter of about 115,800 light-years. The separation between NGC 1055 and M77 is about 7 million light-years.

NGC 1055 is a bright infrared and radio source, particularly in the wavelength for warm carbon monoxide. Astronomers believe that this results from unusually active star formation. It most likely has a transitional nucleus, however, there is a small chance that it could be a LINER.

References

External links
 
 
 Edge-on Spiral Galaxy NGC 1055 in Cetus, Kopernik Observatory & Science Center, Vestal, New York
 Astronomy Picture of the Day - NGC 1055: Galaxy in a Box  24 April 2010
 ESO: A Galaxy on the Edge incl. Photos & Animations
 SEDS – NGC 1055

Barred spiral galaxies
Cetus (constellation)
1055
02173
10208